Wheelchair basketball at the 2015 ASEAN Para Games was held at Singapore Indoor Stadium, Singapore.

Medal table

Medalists

External links
 8th ASEAN Para Games 2015 - Singapore

2015 ASEAN Para Games
Wheelchair basketball at the ASEAN Para Games